Haydn Kemp (17 January 1897–1982) was an English footballer who played in the Football League for Notts County and Thames.

References

1897 births
1982 deaths
English footballers
Association football midfielders
English Football League players
Bolsover Colliery F.C. players
Notts County F.C. players
Thames A.F.C. players
Grantham Town F.C. players
Heanor Town F.C. players